Iglesia Antigua is a census-designated place (CDP) in Cameron County, in the U.S. state of Texas. The population was 413 at the 2010 census. Prior to the 2010 census the community was part of the Bluetown-Iglesia Antigua CDP. It is part of the Brownsville–Harlingen Metropolitan Statistical Area.

Geography
Iglesia Antigua is in southwestern Cameron County, bordered to the east by Bluetown. To the west is Santa Maria, and to the south is the Rio Grande, which forms the Mexico–United States border. U.S. Route 281 passes through the community, leading southeast  to Brownsville and west  to Hidalgo.

References

Census-designated places in Cameron County, Texas
Census-designated places in Texas